WXZO (96.7 MHz "MeTV FM") is a commercial FM radio station licensed to Willsboro, New York. Owned by Vox AM/FM, it primarily serves the Champlain Valley, including Burlington, Vermont, and Plattsburgh, New York. Its studios are located in Colchester, Vermont. The station broadcasts a soft oldies radio format using the syndicated music service known as "MeTV FM."

History
Capstar Broadcasting purchased WXPS in 1998.  On December 14, the sports talk format, which by then also incorporated some hot talk programs, was abandoned in favor of country music as "Kix 96.7"; around the same time, WXPS moved its city of license and transmitter to Willsboro.  This move improved the station's Burlington signal, and the plans for the 97.3 translator were abandoned and the construction permit canceled two months earlier.  The following April, WEAV left the simulcast and implemented a separate talk format.  A year later, WXPS itself changed formats again, this time to smooth jazz.

In April 2001, Clear Channel Communications, who acquired the station after a series of mergers, migrated the smooth jazz format to sister station WLCQ (92.1 FM; now WVTK); upon the completion of this move, WXPS resumed simulcasting with WEAV, this time airing its talk format under the "Zone" branding and the current WXZO call letters.

Clear Channel announced on November 16, 2006, that it would sell its Champlain Valley stations after being bought by private equity firms, resulting in a sale to Vox Communications in 2008.  On September 17, Vox again dissolved the simulcast with WEAV (except for First Light and Imus in the Morning), and WXZO adopted an oldies format, branding itself "96.7 DOT-FM" in reference to former local top 40 station WDOT (1390 AM; later WCAT); much of the station's on-air staff under this format had once worked for WDOT. (Despite this branding, the call letters were not changed, as a relay of The Point uses the WDOT call letters.) The oldies format was previously heard on WVTK.

The oldies format was replaced with a contemporary hit radio format, branded "Planet 96.7", on September 17, 2010; at that time, the remaining simulcasts with WEAV ceased. WXZO competed against WXXX (95.5 FM) and adult top 40 rival WYZY (106.3 FM, now WNBZ-FM). On August 25, 2017, WXZO flipped to rhythmic contemporary as "The New Hot 96.7".

In January 2019, following Vox's acquisition of WXXX, the station began stunting with a promotional loop of oldies music, along with liners read in the first-person that emphasize the word "Me". The last song on WXZO as Hot 96.7 was "Love Lies" by Khalid. On January 11, 2019, WXZO ended stunting and launched a soft oldies format, branded as "96.7 MeTV FM," playing a "variety of classic hits, deep tracks and softer sounds from the '60s, 70s, '80s, and beyond."

References

External links

XZO
Radio stations established in 1996
1996 establishments in New York (state)
Oldies radio stations in the United States